The 1990 ARFU Asian Rugby Championship was the 12th edition of the tournament, and was played in Colombo. The 8 teams were divided in two pool, with final between the winner of both of them. South Korea won the tournament.

Tournament

Pool 1

Pool 2

Finals

Third Place Final

First Place Final

References

1990
1990 rugby union tournaments for national teams
1990 in Sri Lankan sport
International rugby union competitions hosted by Sri Lanka